Jean Paul Lemieux,  (1904 - 1990) was one of the foremost twentieth century painters in Canada. He worked in several different styles, as represented by his five artistic periods.

Biography 
He was born in Quebec City, where he also died. He was raised in Quebec City until 1916, when his family moved to Berkeley, California. In 1917, the family returned to Quebec and settled in Montreal.

From 1926 to 1934, Jean Paul Lemieux studied under Edwin Holgate and others at the Montreal School of Fine Arts. In 1929, he traveled to Europe with his mother. In Paris, he studied advertising and art and met other artists. Lemieux took teaching positions from 1934, first at his former school, then in 1935 at the École du meuble. In 1937, he moved to Quebec City and taught at the École des Beaux-Arts de Québec until his retirement in 1965. His connections at that period include other major artists associated with these schools, such as Alfred Pellan and Paul-Émile Borduas.

In 1960, works by Lemieux along with Edmund Alleyn, Graham Coughtry, Frances Loring and Albert Dumouchel represented Canada at the Venice Biennale.

Awards and honors 
Jean Paul Lemieux received several awards for his works, including the Louis-Philippe Hébert prize in 1971 and the Molson Prize for the Canada Council for the Arts in 1974. In 1968, he became a Companion of the Order of Canada. He was also a member of the Royal Canadian Academy. In 1997, he was posthumously made a Grand Officer of the National Order of Quebec.

Artistic career 
Lemieux was a representational artist whose painting career sometimes had echoes of folk art but, in 1956, at the age of 52, he changed his subject matter and refined his technique. The paintings which followed are among his best known. They usually feature emblematic scenes of French Canada, often combined with a sense of the vast spaces of his homeland.

Works - a selection 
Marine, Baie Saint-Paul, 1935
Notre-Dame protégeant Québec, 1941
Portrait de l’artiste à Beauport-Est, 1943
Le Far West, 1955
Les Parques, 1962
L’été de 1914, 1965
Her Majesty Queen Elizabeth II and His Royal Highness The Duke of Edinburgh, 1979
Dies Irae, 1982–83

The five periods 
The Musée national des beaux-arts du Québec and other sources divide Lemieux's career into five periods:

 Montreal period (1926–1937), marked by realistic naturalism influenced by Quebec regionalism and, later, European post impressionism.
 Primitive period (1940–1947), focused on anecdote and accumulated scenic detail.
 Minimalist period (1951–1955), with cubist structures, which signaled a major turning point in the artist's career.
 Classical period (1956–1970), with a figures fuelled by the sources and practices of abstract art (MNBAQ). It is in this period that Lemieux produced the paintings of lonely figures in desolate, bleak landscapes for which he is so well known today.
 Expressionist period (after 1970), presenting humanity living in a post nuclear attack world.

Legacy 

A set of postage stamps depicting three works by Lemieux, Self-portrait (1974), June Wedding (1972) and Summer (1959) were issued by Canada Post on October 22, 2004. The stamps were released on the day that a retrospective of his work organized to recognize the centenary of the artist's birth opened at the National Gallery of Canada. The Musée national des beaux-arts du Québec (abbreviated as MNBAQ) held the exhibition Jean Paul Lemieux: Silence and Space in 2022.

The Jean Paul Lemieux and Madeleine Des Rosiers fonds, R6612, is in Library and Archives Canada.

References

Sources 
 

 Tel qu’en Lemieux, produced and directed by Guy Robert in the artist's Quebec City studio (L’Office du film du Québec, 1973).

External links 
Images and galleries
 Painting: The Visit
 Gallery from the Canadian government's Cybermuse project.
 Small gallery from Virtual Museum of Canada.

Information
 Short biography (in French) from the Université de Sherbrooke website.

Criticism and interpretation
 The introduction to the Gaëtan Brulotte book (see: References), written by Anne Hébert.

1904 births
1990 deaths
20th-century Canadian painters
Canadian male painters
Modern painters
Grand Officers of the National Order of Quebec
Companions of the Order of Canada
French Quebecers
Artists from Quebec City
Members of the Royal Canadian Academy of Arts
École des beaux-arts de Montréal alumni
20th-century Canadian male artists